Adeline Canac (born 20 May 1990 in Lagny-sur-Marne) is a French retired pair skater. She is a three-time French champion, twice with Maximin Coia and once with Yannick Bonheur.

Career

Canac competed internationally as a single skater, and her highest placement was fourth at the 2004 Triglav Trophy. She was eighth at the 2006 French Figure Skating Championships.

In 2005, Canac began practicing one hour a day with pair skater Maximin Coia and she switched to pairs completely in July 2006. They were the 2008 French national champions, but were forced to miss the European Championships after she sustained a stress fracture in her sternum. They returned in time for the 2008 Worlds, where they placed 14th.

Canac / Coia moved to Canada for training in 2008. They again won the French national championships and were the highest placed French team at the 2009 Europeans, finishing ninth. They did not compete at that season's Worlds.

In the 2009–10 Olympic season, Canac / Coia finished second at the French Championships and 10th at the 2010 Europeans, three places behind the top French pair, Vanessa James / Yannick Bonheur. As a result, Canac / Coia were not selected to represent France at the 2010 Winter Olympics and at 2010 Worlds. They ended their partnership soon after.

In spring 2010, Canac began skating with Yannick Bonheur, who by then was no longer paired with James. Canac and Bonheur's first competition together was the 2010 Master's de Patinage, which they won. They went on to win bronze at the 2010 NRW Trophy and then the national title in December 2010. They then finished 9th at their first Europeans together and 18th at Worlds. In July 2011, it was reported that Canac and Bonheur had split, and she had ended her competitive career in order to pursue academic studies.

Programs

With Bonheur

With Coia

Single skating

Results

Pair skating with Bonheur

Pair skating with Coia

Single skating

References

External links 

 
 
 

1990 births
Living people
People from Lagny-sur-Marne
French female pair skaters
Sportspeople from Seine-et-Marne